is a Japanese politician of the Democratic Party of Japan, a member of the House of Representatives in the Diet (national legislature). A native of Nagoya, Aichi he attended Nagoya Institute of Technology both as undergraduate and graduate. Upon graduation, he joined Japanese National Railways in 1985 and JR Central in 1987 when Japanese National Railways was privatized. He left JR Central in 1994. In 2000 he was elected to the House of Representatives for the first time after an unsuccessful run in 1996.

References

External links
 Official website in Japanese.

Members of the House of Representatives from Aichi Prefecture
Living people
1961 births
Democratic Party of Japan politicians
21st-century Japanese politicians